The 51st Homeland Defense Infantry Division is a military formation of the Republic of Korea Army. The division is subordinated to the Ground Operations Command. It is in charge of local defense and reserve force training in the southwestern part of Gyeonggi. The division founded on 16 August 1982 when it was separated from the 17th Infantry Division. The division headquarters is located in Hwaseong, Gyeonggi Province.

Organization 

Headquarters:
Reconnaissance Battalion
Engineer Battalion
Mobile Battalion
Artillery Battalion
Signal Battalion
Support Battalion
Military Police Battalion
Medical Battalion
Intelligence Battalion
Chemical Company	
Air Defense Company
Headquarters Company
167th Infantry Brigade
168th Infantry Brigade
169th Infantry Brigade

References 

InfDiv0051SK
Military units and formations established in 1982
Hwaseong, Gyeonggi